Rigsbee's Rock House is a historic home and national historic district located near Hillsborough, Orange County, North Carolina.  The house was built in 1929, and is a -story, rectangular, white flint rubble dwelling with a steeply pitched hipped roof in the Tudor Revival style. The house was restored in 1986–1987. Also on the property are the contributing original two car, detached garage, a pump house, and an outdoor swimming pool, each constructed of white flint rock.

It was listed on the National Register of Historic Places in 1988.

References

Houses on the National Register of Historic Places in North Carolina
Historic districts on the National Register of Historic Places in North Carolina
Tudor Revival architecture in North Carolina
Houses completed in 1929
Hillsborough, North Carolina
Buildings and structures in Orange County, North Carolina
National Register of Historic Places in Orange County, North Carolina